Jentoft is a surname. Notable people with the surname include:

Hartvig Jentoft (1693–1739), Norwegian tradesman and sailor
Morten Jentoft (born 1956), Norwegian journalist